The 2013–14 Dinamo Riga season will be the 6th season for the Kontinental Hockey League franchise that was established on April 7, 2008.

Standings

Last updated: 4 March 2014Source: KHL.ru,  KHL.ru

Schedule and results

Pre-season

Games was played at Tipsport Arena in Prague, Czech Republic.
Games was played at Arena Riga in Riga, Latvia.

Regular season

Player stats
Updated on 26 February 2014.  Source: hockeydb.com Source: eliteprospects.com Source: khl.ru
Skaters

Goaltenders

†Denotes player spent time with another team before joining the Dinamo.  Stats reflect time with the Dinamo only.
‡Traded mid-season
Bold/italics denotes franchise record

Roster

Transactions

Free agent signed

Free agents lost

Extensions

Draft picks

Dinamo Rigas' picks at the 2013 KHL Junior Draft, which was held in Donetsk, Ukraine on May 25–26, 2013.

References

Dinamo Riga seasons
Riga